Alex Mann (born 6 January 2002) is a Welsh rugby union player, currently playing for United Rugby Championship side Cardiff. His preferred position is flanker.

Cardiff
Mann was named in the Cardiff academy squad for the 2021–22 season. He made his debut for Cardiff in the second round of the 2021–22 European Rugby Champions Cup against , coming on as a replacement.

References

External links
itsrugby.co.uk Profile

2002 births
Living people
Welsh rugby union players
Cardiff Rugby players
Rugby union flankers